The Tamil Nadu Football Association (also known as Tamilnadu; abbreviated TNFA), formerly the Madras Football Association, is one of the 37 Indian state football associations that are affiliated to the All India Football Federation. The TNFA administers lower tier football in the state of Tamil Nadu.

History 

The first football tournament in Madras was held in 1894 with 10 teams from all over the country. From the year 1895, the Madras Gymkhana Club hosted an annual tournament. The winning team gets the EK Chetty Cup. Regimental units like Queens Own Regiment, Lancashire Fusiliers, 2nd Battalion the Dorsetshire Regiment, and 5th Field Battery - Royal Regiment of Artillery participated in the tournament. The EK Chetty Cup was won by regimental teams till 1933. The Pachaiyappa High School became the first Indian and non-military team to win it. The South Indian Athletic Association instituted the Jatprole Cup tournament.

Madras Football Association was formed on 5 January 1934, following drafting of the constitution on 26 October 1933, with jurisdiction for the whole of the original undivided state of Madras, including the present Andhra and Kerala states, by the members of the Madras United Club - a body founded by sport loving Indians. Madras Football Association league championship was started in 1934. Pachaiyappa's football club won the inaugural 1934–35 league championship. The MFA started conducting the First division league from 1936, and the Second division from 1937. In the year of 1978, Madras city clubs formed a separate association under Chennai Football Association. renaming the state federation as the Tamil Nadu Football Association.

N. Vittal served as the president of Tamil Nadu Football Association. He also served as the vice-president of All India Football Federation. T.R. Govindarajan served as the secretary of the TNFA.

Some of the tournaments conducted by the TNFA are Tamil Nadu State League, Vittal Trophy, Champions Trophy - Universal Cup, and TFA Shield. At present, all these three tournaments are not conducted. The major leagues in the Tamil Nadu happen in districts like Chennai and Madurai. Chennai district league (Chennai Super League) is conducted by Chennai Football Association (CFA), and the Madurai district league by Madurai District Football Association. The Tiruvallur District Football Association conducted the Don Bosco - Fr. McFerran Trophy All India football tournament sanctioned by the Tamil Nadu Football Association and All India Football Federation (AIFF).

Competitions

Men's
 Chennai Football League
 Tamil Nadu State League
 TFA Shield
 Vittal Trophy

Women's
 Tamil Nadu Women's League

Teams

List of Tamil Nadu Football Association controlled teams

List of men's association football clubs in Tamil Nadu

List of women's association football clubs in Tamil Nadu

List of men's association football clubs in Chennai

Chennai Football Association 

Chennai Football Association has 96 affiliated clubs and  conducts about 450 league matches for its member clubs, dividing them to 4 senior divisions, apart from conducting league for the schools and colleges. St. Joseph's Group of Institutions was the principal sponsor for the last nine years. Rohit Ramesh is the president of the Chennai Football Association.

References

External links
Tamil Nadu Football Association at the AIFF
FC Marina at the FC Marina

Football governing bodies in India
Football in Tamil Nadu
1934 establishments in India
Sports organizations established in 1934